Mary Hynes is a Canadian radio and television broadcaster. Formerly associated with TVOntario, including the programs Imprint and Studio 2, which  she co-hosted with Steve Paikin during its first two seasons (1994–95 and 1995–96), she currently hosts the weekly documentary series Tapestry on CBC Radio One.

References

Canadian television journalists
Canadian radio journalists
Living people
CBC Radio hosts
Canadian women television journalists
Canadian women radio journalists
Year of birth missing (living people)
Canadian women radio hosts